The following is a list of Oricon number-one singles of 2004.

Oricon Weekly Singles Chart

References 

2004 in Japanese music
Japan Oricon
Oricon 2004